The Greatest Hits is the first compilation album by Cheap Trick. It contains many of Cheap Trick's popular songs, as well as a previously unreleased cover version of The Beatles' "Magical Mystery Tour", which according to the liner notes, was an outtake from the Lap of Luxury album. Though it peaked at only #174 on the Billboard 200 albums chart, it remained a steady seller, and was certified platinum for one million U.S. shipments seven years after its release.

Rendered obsolete by succeeding compilations that contain almost all of the songs in this album, it was nonetheless re-released in 2003, in a re-mastered edition with the addition of "Clock Strikes Ten".

Track listing (1991 U.S. release)
All songs written by Rick Nielsen, except where noted.
 "Magical Mystery Tour" (John Lennon, Paul McCartney) – 4:08
 "Dream Police" – 3:49
 "Don't Be Cruel" (Otis Blackwell, Elvis Presley) – 3:07
 "Tonight It's You" (Rick Nielsen, Robin Zander, Jon Brant, Mark Radice) – 4:47
 "She's Tight" – 2:58
 "I Want You to Want Me [live version]" – 3:38
 "If You Want My Love" – 3:36
 "Ain't That a Shame [live version]" (Antoine Domino, Dave Bartholomew) – 5:10
 "Surrender" – 4:16
 "The Flame" (Bob Mitchell, Nick Graham) – 5:36
 "I Can't Take It" (Zander) – 3:28
 "Can't Stop Fallin' into Love" (Nielsen, Zander, Tom Petersson) – 3:45
 "Voices" – 4:22

Track listing (2003 international remastered re-release)
All songs written by Rick Nielsen, except where noted.
 "Clock Strikes Ten [live version]" – 3:20
 "Dream Police" – 3:49
 "Don't Be Cruel" (Blackwell, Presley) – 3:07
 "Tonight It's You" (Brandt, Nielsen, Radice, Zander) – 4:47
 "She's Tight" – 2:58
 "I Want You to Want Me [live version]" – 3:38
 "If You Want My Love" – 3:36
 "Ain't That a Shame [live version]" (Domino, Bartholomew) – 5:10
 "Surrender" – 4:16
 "The Flame" (Mitchell, Graham) – 5:36
 "I Can't Take It" (Zander) – 3:28
 "Can't Stop Fallin' into Love" (Nielsen, Zander, Petersson) – 3:45
 "Voices" – 4:22
 "Magical Mystery Tour" (Lennon, McCartney) – 4:08

Track listing (Japanese edition)
In Japan, this compilation was released as a double album consisting of two compact discs, one entitled "Cheap Side" and the other "Trick Side". This extended version has gone out of print since the issue of the remastered edition in 2003.

Disc 1 ("Cheap" Side)
 "Hello There" – 1:41
 "On Top of the World" – 4:01
 "ELO Kiddies" – 3:41
 "Hot Love" – 2:30
 "Big Eyes" – 3:10
 "Clock Strikes Ten" – 2:59
 "California Man" (Roy Wood) – 3:44
 "Stop This Game" (Nielsen, Zander) – 3:57
 "I Know What I Want" – 4:29
 "Just Got Back" (Nielsen) – 2:05
 "The Doctor" – 4:03
 "High Roller" (Nielsen, Petersson, Zander) – 3:58
 "Gonna Raise Hell" – 9:20
 "Speak Now or Forever Hold Your Peace" (Terry Reid) – 4:35
 "Day Tripper" (Lennon, McCartney) – 3:33

Disc 2 ("Trick" Side)
 "Magical Mystery Tour" (Lennon, McCartney) – 4:08
 "Dream Police" – 3:49
 "Don't Be Cruel" (Blackwell, Presley) – 3:07
 "Tonight It's You" (Radice, Brant, Nielsen, Zander) – 4:47
 "She's Tight" – 2:58
 "I Want You to Want Me [live version]" – 3:38
 "If You Want My Love" – 3:36
 "Ain't That a Shame" (Domino, Bartholomew) – 5:10
 "Surrender" – 4:16
 "The Flame" (Mitchell, Graham) – 5:36
 "I Can't Take It" (Zander) – 3:28
 "Can't Stop Fallin' into Love" (Nielsen, Zander, Petersson) – 3:45
 "Voices" – 4:22

Charts

Certifications

References

1991 greatest hits albums
Albums produced by Todd Rundgren
Albums produced by Jack Douglas (record producer)
Albums produced by Roy Thomas Baker
Albums produced by Tony Platt
Cheap Trick compilation albums